Ovsyanka is a rural locality (a selo) in Ovsyankovsky Selsoviet of Zeysky District, Amur Oblast, Russia. The population was 2,910 as of 2018. There are 42 streets.

Geography 
Ovsyanka is located on the right bank of the Zeya River, 36 km southwest of Zeya (the district's administrative centre) by road. Alexandrovka is the nearest rural locality.

References 

Rural localities in Zeysky District